Tricula hortensis is a species of freshwater snail with a gill and an operculum, an aquatic gastropod mollusk in the family Pomatiopsidae.

Distribution 
This species of freshwater snail occurs in China.

Genetics 
The complete mitochondrial genome of Tricula hortensis was published in 2010. Its length is 15,179 nucleotides and it contains 13 genes.

Parasites 
Tricula hortensis is an intermediate host for Schistosoma sinensium.

References

External links 

Pomatiopsidae
Gastropods described in 2003